The Ministry of Commerce (MOFCOM) is a cabinet-level executive agency of the State Council of China that is responsible for formulating policy on foreign trade, export and import regulations, foreign direct investments, consumer protection, market competition (competition regulator) and negotiating bilateral and multilateral trade agreements. It is in charge of the administration of foreign trade pursuant to the Foreign Trade Law. The current Commerce minister is Wang Wentao.

History 
Before October 1949, the Ministry of Economic Affairs was the governing agency of the Republic of China on the mainland responsible for economic trade issues. The agency was created in 1931 and reorganized in 1937.

In November 1949, a month after the People's Republic of China was established, the Chinese Communist Party formed the Ministry of Trade (贸易部) while the MOEA continued to operate in Taiwan and several other islands

In August 1952, the Ministry was renamed to Ministry of Foreign Trade (对外贸易部). Ye Jizhuang was the first Minister and died in the post in 1967.

In March 1982, the Ministry of Foreign Trade was merged with the Ministry of Foreign Economic Liaison (对外经济联络部), the State Import and Export Regulation Commission (国家进出口管理委员会), and the State Foreign Investment Regulation Commission (国家外国投资管理委员会), and became the Ministry of Foreign Economic Relations and Trade (对外经济贸易部).

In March 1993, the Ministry of Foreign Economic Relations and Trade was renamed to the Ministry of Foreign Trade and Economic Cooperation (对外贸易经济合作部).

In the spring of 2003, the former Ministry of Foreign Trade and Economic Cooperation went through a reorganization and was renamed Ministry of Commerce.

The ministry also incorporates the former State Economic and Trade Commission and the State Development Planning Commission.

List of ministers

Departmental structure 
The Ministry of Commerce is structured into the following departments:

MOFCOM and the CEPA
MOFCOM's responsibility includes fostering closer partnership between the economies of the Special Administrative Regions of Hong Kong and Macau, respectively, with the economy of the rest of the People's Republic of China. To that end the Vice Minister An Min, and the previous Financial Secretary of Hong Kong, Antony Leung, concluded the Closer Economic Partnership Arrangement (CEPA). New agreements are continually negotiated between An and the current Financial Secretary John Tsang under the auspices of the CEPA. Similar agreements were also concluded between the MOFCOM and Secretariat for Economy and Finance of Macau.

See also 

 China International Electronic Commerce Center (CIECC)
 China Investment Promotion Agency (CIPA)
 Ministries of the People's Republic of China
 Ministry of Economic Affairs of the Republic of China

References

External links 
 Ministry of Commerce of PRC Official website

2003 establishments in China
Anti-dumping authorities
Consumer organizations in China
Commerce
Ministries established in 2003
Regulation in China
China